Mustamäe (Estonian for Black Hill) is one of the 8 administrative districts of Tallinn, the capital of Estonia. The smallest by area (it covers only 8.1 km²), it is at the same time the second largest district by population with 66,305 inhabitants.
It is located 5 km from the centre of Tallinn and is bordered by districts Haabersti, Nõmme, and Kristiine. Local housing is mostly represented by 5–9 storeys high panel blocks of flats, built in the 1960–1970s.

Geography
Mustamäe covers 8.1 km² and is located 5 km from the centre of Tallinn.
Mustamäe is bordered by the streets Tuuliku, Kadaka tee, Tildri, Siili, Nõmme tee, Retke tee, Ehitajate tee, Üliõpilaste tee, Raja, Soone, Lossi, Mäepealse, Kadaka puiestee, Järveotsa tee. Mustamäe is bordered by Nõmme hill (part of the Baltic Klint) in the south and Tallinn Zoo in northwest.

Mustamäe is divided into 4 subdistricts:
Kadaka
Mustamäe
Siili
Sääse

History
Established in 1962 and completed in 1973 as a microdistrict, Mustamäe was Tallinn's first large district.
Similar districts, Õismäe and Lasnamäe were completed later.

Population

Mustamäe has a population of 66,305.

Landmarks and institutions

Tallinn Bus Company
Tallinn University of Technology
TTÜ Sports Hall
Estonian Information Technology College
Mustamäe Regional Hospital
National Institute of Chemical Physics and Biophysics
"Tehnopol" Technology Park including the headquarters of Skype
Center of culture "Kaja"
Conference center "Sütiste maja"
Mustamäe Boiler Plant with a 125-m chimney
Männi Park
Shopping centre "Mustamäe Kaubanduskeskus"
Shopping center "Magistral"
Marketplace "Szolnoki turg" (named after the bus stop "Szolnok", which in turn is named after the town Szolnok in Hungary)
Headquarters of Eesti Energia
Tiit Soku Korvpallikool (Tiit Sokk Basketball School)
Nightclub "Aspirin"
Sculpture "Mõtlik mees" (Thoughtful man) by Tauno Kangro

Schools

Tallinna 32. Keskkool
Tallinna 37. Keskkool
Tallinna 53. Keskkool
Tallinna 63. Põhikool
Tallinna Arte Gümnaasium (former School No. 49)
Eurogümnaasium
Tallinna Mustamäe Gümnaasium (former School No. 44)
Tallinna Mustamäe Humanitaargümnaasium (former School No. 52)
Tallinna Mustamäe Reaalgümnaasium (former School No. 51)
Tallinna Saksa Gümnaasium (former School No. 54)
Tallinna Tehnikagümnaasium (former School No. 43)

Transportation

Mustamäe is connected to the rest of Tallinn via three main streets:
Mustamäe tee and Sõpruse puiestee lead to the centre of Tallinn, and Ehitajate tee crosses Mustamäe while connecting Nõmme and Õismäe. Other major streets include: A. H. Tammsaare tee, Kadaka tee, Ed. Vilde tee, and Akadeemia tee. Most of the public transportation operates on these streets. Mustamäe is serviced by buses and trolleybuses. Out the 8 trolleybus lines
of Tallinn, 6 operate (partly) in Mustamäe.

Government
List of District Elders of Mustamäe:

Cultural significance
Books:
"The Autumn Ball: Scenes of City Life" (1979) by Mati Unt (translated from Estonian by Mart Aru)
"Mustamäe armastus" (1978) by Arvo Valton
"Minu Mustamäe" (2013) by Armin Kõomägi

Songs:
"Mustamäe valss" (Mustamäe Walz), composed by Avo Tamme; lyrics by Heldur Karmo
"Kus on mu kodu"' (Where is my home?), by Agent M

References

External links

Mustamäe linnaosa üldplaneering
Mustamäe Metamorphoses by Piret Viires

Districts of Tallinn